Psilocybe mairei is a species of mushroom in the family Hymenogastraceae. It is found in Algeria and Morocco and contains the psychoactive compound psilocybin. The oldest example of rock art suggesting use of psychedelic mushrooms might depict P. mairei. In 1992 the Italian ethnobotanist Giorgio Samorini reported finding a painted mural from Tassili n'Ajjer in the Sahara desert in southeast Algeria, dated 7000 to 9000 BCE, portraying mushrooms (later tentatively identified as P. mairei).

See also
List of Psilocybin mushrooms
Psilocybin mushrooms
Psilocybe

References

Entheogens
Psychoactive fungi
mairei
Psychedelic tryptamine carriers
Fungi of Africa